Christian Yves Dominique Pichot is an electrical engineer at the French National Center for Scientific Research (CNRS) in Valbonne, France. He was named a Fellow of the Institute of Electrical and Electronics Engineers (IEEE) in 2013 for his work in microwave tomography and antenna designs.

References

Fellow Members of the IEEE
Living people
Year of birth missing (living people)
Place of birth missing (living people)
French National Centre for Scientific Research scientists